Abraham van Calraet, or Kalraat (7–12 October 1642, Dordrecht – 11 June 1722, Amsterdam) was a Dutch Golden Age painter and engraver.

Biography
He learned to paint from AEmilius and Samuel Hup, or Huppe, who were well known sculptors in the city of Dordrecht. After learning to sculpt, young Abraham took to the painter's brush, and started on fruit, while helping his father, who was a wood sculptor.

He resided throughout his life in Dordrecht, and may have been a pupil of Aelbert Cuyp, who was a generation older. Cuyp's signature was often forged on top of Calraet's paintings.

Abraham Bredius was responsible for the first "rediscovery" of this painter, re-attributing two of his still life paintings that at that time were considered to be by Cuyp. Cornelis Hofstede de Groot strongly disagreed with him and the Cuyp-Calraet question was escalated in the Dutch newspapers after Frits Lugt announced a new Abraham Calraet painting in the Frans Hals Museum in 1915. Bredius "won" the argument and many of his attributions still stand today.

Calraet is known today for still life pieces with fruit, and recently also for landscapes with horses. He was the teacher of his younger brother, the landscape painter Barent van Kalraet.

References

 Laurens J. Bol, Goede onbekenden, Hedendaagse herkenning en waardering van verscholen, voorbijgezien en onderschat talent, Tableau BV, Utrecht (1982),

External links

 Works and literature on Abraham van Calraet

1642 births
1722 deaths
Dutch Golden Age painters
Dutch male painters
Artists from Dordrecht
Dutch still life painters